Buser is a surname. Notable people with the surname include:

Alfred L. Buser (1888–1956), American football player and coach
Eduard Buser (1913–?), Swiss footballer
Felix Buser (born 1957), Swiss sprint canoer
Gustav Buser, Swiss footballer 
Hans Buser (1513–1544), Swiss nobleman
James Buser (born 1979), Australian rugby league footballer
Johan Büser (born 1983). Swedish politician
Jürg Peter Buser (born 1946), Swiss mathematician
Martin Buser (born 1958), Swiss-born American sled dog racer
Michael Buser (born 1952), American judge
Paul Buser (born 1934), Swiss sports shooter
Walter Buser (1926–2019), Swiss politician

See also
Butzer (surname), another surname